The 2000 European Beach Volleyball Championships were held from August 24 to August 27, 2000 in Bilbao, Spain. It was the eighth official edition of the men's event, which started in 1993, while the women competed for the seventh time.

Men's competition
 A total number of 32 participating couples

Women's competition
 A total number of 30 participating couples

References
 Beach Volleyball Results

2000
E
B
2000